Julian Charrière (born 1987) is a French-Swiss conceptual artist currently living and working in Berlin. He utilises a wide range of artistic approaches including photography, performance, sculpture, and video to address concepts relating to time and human's relationship to the natural world.

Early life and education 
Charrière was born in Morges, Switzerland to a Swiss father and French mother. He studied art at the École cantonale d’art du Valais in Switzerland before moving to Berlin to finish his degree at the Universität der Künste where he graduated in 2013 from Olafur Eliasson’s Institute of Spatial Experiments.

Career 

Charrière’s research-driven practice fuses together art, science, and anthropology, highlighting the tensions resulting from our modern world. Inspired by land artists such as Robert Smithson as well as writers like author J. G. Ballard and philosopher Dehlia Hannah or Timothy Morton, his work contributes to a discussion of social and environmental implications of the advancements which have pushed society forward. These ideas link Charrière to the 19th century Romantic era during which human’s place within the world was reexamined as a response to the industrial revolution and humanist philosophy. Throughout his body of work Charrière experiments with nonconventional materials and methods for the symbolic significance that they carry. Time is an often-used matter as Charrière creates artworks intended to create and exist within their own timeline while commenting on their place within the broader human timescale.

Interested in the concept of fossils as physical markers of time and more specifically what artifacts will be left behind to shape future generations’ interpretations of his era, Charrière has crafted a “geo-archaeology of the future.” Geological specimens being the only form of documentation of Earth's early eons, the artist reinterpreted this idea to create the series Metamorphism wherein electronic waste is molten with artificial lava and transformed into natural-looking rocks, essentially returning the technological devices to the raw materials from which they are made. This project is one of several sculptural series by Charrière using natural and human-made materials which provides a physical commentary on the increasingly digitalized world.

Much of his work has been the result of various expeditions around the world, focusing on locations impacted by humanity. Such locations visited by Charrière include the Semipalatinsk Test Site, a former USSR nuclear test site, and its American equivalent, the Bikini Atoll in the Marshall Islands. Notably from these two voyages came a series of photographs documenting the desolate remnants of the sites developed from analog film exposed to nuclear materials, giving the invisible force of radioactivity a visible presence within the images. Following these voyages Julian Charrière also co-wrote with Nadim Samman - whom he traveled with- As We Used to Float, straddling the genres of travelog and critical essay. Described as: "toggling between a personal account of a sea journey, above and below water, and a critical investigation of postcolonial geography, As We Used to Float develops broader reflections on place and subjectivity".

Charrière has been the recipient of several prestigious awards. He was awarded the Kiefer Hablitzel Award during the Swiss Art Awards in both 2013 and 2015. In 2016 Charrière received the Kaiserring Stipendium für Junge Kunst which resulted in a solo exhibition at the Mönchehaus Museum Goslar in Germany. In 2018 the artist received the Prix Mobilière  which honors young artists addressing particularly socially relevant issues and make up new collective perspectives with their positions; as well as the GASAG Kunstpreis, awarded every two years to outstanding artistic positions at the intersection of art, science, and technology. In 2021 he was nominated for the Prix-Marcel-Duchamp, as well as for the Hans-Purrmann-Prize  and the Prix de la Fondation Choi pour l’art contemporain. In the beginning of 2021 Charrière was invited by the artists-in-labs KAUST-Swiss Residency Exchange for a three-month Artist Residency in Saudi Arabia.

In addition to working as a solo artist, Charrière has collaborated with other artists, being a member of the Berlin-based artist collective, Das Numen. The collective has shown across Europe and has been the recipient of numerous awards. In 2012, Charrière collaborated with the artist Julius von Bismarck on the site-specific performance piece Some Pigeons Are More Equal Than Others for the 13th Venice Architecture Biennale. The two have continued to work together, producing several exhibitions in tandem with one another.

The artist became the subject of international news in March 2017 when Berlin police were called to his studio after the testing of his new piece commenting on peaceful scientific development and the dangers of climate change entitled The Purchase of the South Pole. The three-meter long air cannon was originally meant to shoot coconuts from the Bikini Atoll as a part of the first Antarctic Biennale. Because of its seizure the artwork never made it to Antarctica and currently remains in the custody of the German authorities.

In the course of his invitation to the Antarctic Biennial 2017, the artist developed a new body of work in where he intensively explored the polar regions and their mode of representation in the collective visual memory of the 21st century. This resulted in his most extensive film work at that point, Towards No Earthly Pole, which formed a focal point in the artist's three solo exhibitions of the same name (MASI Lugano, 2019, Aargauer Kunsthaus, 2020, Dallas Museum of Art, 2021). The exhibitions became a journey through the cosmos of the artist, while offering an exploration of the impact of human activity on nature. Charrière uses the two opposing elements of ice and fire to symbolize change and transformation and the contrast between them defines the exhibitions and guides through them. His curiosity and interest in understanding the environment lead him to areas that are global flashpoints for our past, present, and future. A publication is dedicated to the film work Towards No Earthly Pole and places it in a context throughout essays written by leading scholars from the disciplines of philosophy, film research, and art history including Francesca Benini, Amanda Boetzkes, Katherine Brodbeck, Dehlia Hannah, Scott MacKenzie & Anna Westerstahl Stenport, Shane McCorristine, Nadim Samman and Katrin Weilenmann as well as a conversation between the artist and Prof. Dr. Konrad Steffen, Professor of Climate and Cryosphere at ETH Zurich and EPFL.

In 2021 Charrière participated in the Leister Expedition Around North Greenland 2021, a Swiss-Danish expedition. Its primary purpose was to conduct research into climate change in the Arctic. During the expedition the team landed on a 300-meter-long islet, erected by mud and soil, believed to be Oodaaq island, only later to realize they actually had just discovered the northernmost island of Greenland's coast. Charrière, only artist invited to take part in the expedition covered the discovery.

Art market 
Charrière has been represented by Sean Kelly Gallery since 2017.

Controversy 
In early 2023, French fashion brand Zadig & Voltaire came under fire for a promotional Instagram video featuring a flaming fountain after social media users said it bore a striking resemblance to Charrière's video work And Beneath It All Flows Liquid Fire (2019).

Selected exhibitions 
Solo exhibitions

Horizons, Dittrich & Schlechtriem, Berlin, Germany, 2011
On The Sidewalk, I Have Forgotten The Dinosauria Dittrich & Schlechtriem, Berlin, Germany, 2013
We are all Astronauts, Centre Culturel Suisse, Paris, 2014
 Clockwork, (in collaboration with Julius von Bismark) Oben, Vienna, Austria, 2014
Die Welt ist mittelgross, Kunstverein Arnsberg, Germany, 2014
Future Fossil Spaces, Musée cantonal des Beaux-arts de Lausanne, Lausanne, Switzerland, 2014
Somewhere, Rudolph-Scharpf-Galerie, Wilhelm-Hack-Museum, Ludwigshafen, Germany, 2014
Polygon, Galerie Bugada & Cargnel, Paris, France, 2015
Freeze, Memory, Sean Kelly Gallery, New York, 2016
Into the Hollow, Dittrich & Schlechtriem, Berlin, Germany, 2016
For They That Sow the Wind, Parasol unit foundation for contemporary art, London, England, 2016
Julian Charrière, Mönchehaus Museum Goslar, Goslar, Germany, 2016
First Light, Galerie Tschudi, Zuoz, Switzerland, 2016
Pitch Drop, Sies + Höke Galerie, Düsseldorf, Germany, 2016
Desert Now, (in collaboration with Julius von Bismarck and Felix Kiessling) Steve Turner Gallery, Los Angeles, USA, 2016
Objects In Mirror Might Be Closer Than They Appear, (in collaboration with Julius von Bismarck) Villa Bernasconi, Grand-Lancy, Switzerland, 2016
Siempre cuenta cuántos cuentos cuentas, Despacio, San José, Costa Rica, 2016
Das Numen – Meatus, Dittrich & Schlechtriem, Berlin, Germany, 2017
Ever Since We Crawled Out, Galerie Tschudi, Zuoz, Germany, 2017
Julius von Bismarck und Julian Charrière. I’m Afraid I Must Ask You to Leave, with Julius von Bismarck, Kunstpalais Erlangen, Erlangen, Germany, 2018
An Invitation to Disappear, Ben Brown Fine Arts, Hong Kong, China, 2018
GASAG Kunstpreis 2018: Julian Charrière. As We Used to Float, Berlinische Galerie, Berlin, Germany, 2018
An Invitation to Disappear | Giétro 2018 - 1818, Dam of Mauvoisin, Musée de Bagnes, Le Châble, Switzerland, 2018
An Invitation to Disappear, Kunsthalle Mainz, Mainz, Germany, 2018
Twin Earth, with Marguerite Humeau, SALTS, Basel, Switzerland, 2019
All We Ever Wanted Was Everything and Everywhere, MAMbo, Bologna, Italy, 2019
Silent World, Dittrich & Schlechtriem, Berlin, Germany, 2019
Julian Charrière + Julius von Bismarck: I Am Afraid I Must Ask You to Leave, with Julius von Bismarck, Sies + Höke, Düsseldorf, Germany, 2019
Towards No Earthly Pole, MASI Lugano, Lugano, Switzerland, 2019
Towards No Earthly Pole, Sean Kelly Gallery, New York City, USA, 2020
Thickens, pools, flows, rushes, slows, Sies + Höke, Düsseldorf, Germany, 2020
Towards No Earthly Pole, Aargauer Kunsthaus, Aarau, Switzerland, 2020
Towards No Earthly Pole, Dallas Museum of Art, 2021
Soothsayers, DITTRICH & SCHLECHTRIEM, Berlin, Germany, 2021

Group exhibitions

Berlin 2000 - Playing among the Ruins, Museum of Contemporary Art Tokyo, Tokyo, Japan, 2011
Über Lebens Kunst, Haus der Kulturen der Welt, Berlin, Germany, 2011
Without Destination, Reykjavik Art Museum, Reykjavik, Iceland, 2011
Common Ground, 13th International Architecture Exhibition – La Biennale di Venezia, Venice, Italy, 2012
Des Présents Inachevés, Les Modules du Palais de Tokyo at 12th Art Biennale de Lyon, Lyon, France, 2013
move, – align – avid / Vom Schwarm als Prinzip and Phäenomen, Kunstverein Harburger Bahnhof, Hamburg, Germany, 2013
Kochi-Muziris Biennale, Fort Kochi, Kerala, India, 2014
Festival of Future Nows, Neue Nationalgalerie, Berlin, Germany, 2014
One Place Next to Another, Winzavod Center for Contemporary Art, Moscow, Russia, 2014
The Future of Memory, Kunsthalle Wien, Vienna, Austria, 2015
Rare Earth, Thyssen-Bornemisza Art Contemporary, Vienna, Austria, 2015
The Forces Behind The Forms, Galerie Taxispalais, Innsbruck, Austria, 2015
The Forces Behind The Forms, Kunstmuseum Thun, Thun, Switzerland, 2016
The Forces Behind The Forms, Kunstmuseen Krefeld, Museen Haus Lange and Haus Esters, Krefeld, Germany, 2016
Nuit blanche, Villa Médicis, Rome, Italy, 2016
Zeitgeist - Art Da Nova Berlim, Centro Cultural Banco do Brasil, Rio de Janeiro, Brazil, 2016
+ultra. gestaltung schafft wissen, Martin-Gropius-Bau, Berlin, Germany, 2016
Deep Inside, 5th Moscow International Biennale for Young Art, Moscow, Russia, 2016
Hybrid Modus. Hybrid Modus New positions in bio-, living- and digital sculpture, Skulptur Bredelar 2016, Bredelar, Netherlands, 2016
The End of the World, Centro per l’Arte Contemporanea Luigi Pecci, Prato, Italy, 2016
Interractions n°4, Les Abattoirs, FRAC Midi-Pyrénées, Toulouse, France, 2016
No One Belongs Here More Than You, Despacio, San José, Costa Rica, 2016
The Antarctic Biennale, Antarctica, 2017
Viva Arte Viva, 57th Venice Biennale, Venice, Italy, 2017 
Le Rêve des formes, Palais de Tokyo, Paris, France, 2017
Produktion. Made in Germany Drei, Sprengel Museum, Hanover, Germany, 2017
Tidalectics, TBA21-Augarten, Vienna, Austria, 2017
De Nature en Sculpture, Villa Datris, Foundation pour la sculpture contemporaine, L’Isle sur la Sorgue, France, 2017
Biotopia, Kunsthalle Mainz, Mainz, Germany, 2017
Entangle / Physics and the Artistic Imagination, Bildmuseet, Umeå University, Sweden, 2018-2019
Beobachtung, Dittrich & Schlechtriem, Berlin, Germany, 2017
57th International Art Exhibition: Viva Arte Viva, La Biennale di Venezia, Arsenale, Venice, Italy, 2017
Notes on our Equilibrium, CAB Art Center, Brussels, Belgium, 2017
Post-Nature, A Museum as an Ecosystem, Taipei Biennial, Taipei Fine Arts Museum, Taipei, Taiwan, 2018
Entangle/Physics and the Artistic Imagination, Bildmuseet Umea, Sweden, 2018
 Adapt to Survive: Notes from the Future, Concrete, Dubai, United Arab Emirates, 2018
Wildnis, Schirn Kunsthalle Frankfurt, Frankfurt, Germany, 2018
Paradise, Wesport Arts Center, Wesport, USA, 2018
Everything Was Forever, Until It Was No More – 1st Riga Biennial, Former Faculty of Biology of the University of Latvia, Riga, Latvia, 2018
Adapt to Survive: Notes from the Future, Hayward Gallery's HENI Project Space, Southbank Centre, London, UK, 2018
WATER, Queensland Art Gallery of Modern Art, Queensland, Australia, 2019
El cuarto mundo – 14 Bienal de Artes Mediales de Santiago, Museu de Arte Contemporaneo, Santiago, Chile, 2019
Nowness Experiments: The Mesh, K11 Art Foundation, Shanghai, China, 2019
Gaïa, que deviens-tu?, Maison Guerlain, Paris, France, 2019
The Drowned World, Ontario Place Cinesphere; Toronto Biennial of Art, Toronto, Canada, 2019
Tomorrow is the Question, ARoS Aarhus Kunstmuseum, Aarhus, Denmark, 2019
Art Basel ‘With or Without People’, Hong Kong Convention and Exhibition Centre, Wan Chai, China, 2019
La Fabrique du Vivant, Centre Pompidou, Paris, France, 2019
Bon Voyage! Reisen in der Kunst der Gegenwart, Ludwig Forum, Aachen, Germany, 2020
 Potential Worlds 2: Eco-Fiction, Migros Museum für Gegenwartskunst, Zurich, Switzerland, 2020
Tiger in Space, Contemporary Art Museum of Estonia, Tallinn, Estonia, 2020
STUDIO BERLIN, Berghain, Berlin, Germany, 2020
Critical Zones, ZKM - Zentrum für Kunst und Medien, Karlsruhe, Germany, 2020
La collection, Musée Cantonal des Beaux-Arts Lausanne, Lausanne, Switzerland, 2020
(Un)endliche Ressourcen, Städtische Galerie Karlsruhe, Karlsruhe, Germany, 2020
Of Roots and Clouds, Sapporo International Art Festival, Sapporo, Japan, 2020
Angespannte Zustände, Staatsgalerie Stuttgart, Stuttgart, Germany, 2021
Tonlagen, Hellerau European Centre of The Arts, Dresden, Germany, 2021
Schweizer Skulpturen nach 1945, Aargauer Kunsthaus, Aarau, Switzerland, 2021
Hans-Purrmann-Preis, Kulturhof Flachsgasse, Speyer, Germany 2021
Biocenosis, Art of Change 21, Parc Chanot, Marseille, France 2021
5. Sammlungspräsentation, Philara Collection, Düsseldorf, Germany 2021
Inventing Nature. Pflanzen in der Kunst, Staatliche Kunsthalle Karlsruhe, Karlsruhe, Germany 2021
Scratching the Surface, Hamburger Bahnhof, Berlin, Germany  2021
Climate Care - Reimagining Shared Planetary Futures, Vienna Biennial, MAK, Vienna, Austria 2021
ISOLATION – Tree Analysis, Spiegelarche, Roldisleben, Germany, 2021
How Will We Live Together? - The 17th International Architecture Exhibition, Venice, Italy 
Guangzhou Image Triennial 2021, Guangdong Museum of Art, Guangdong Province, China 2021
Im Wald, Kunsthaus Grenchen, Grenchen, Switzerland 2021
Prix Marcel Duchamp, Centre Pompidou, Paris, France 2021

References

External links
 
Julian Charrière: Future Fossil Spaces, Mousse Publishing
Julian Charrière - Polygon, The Green Box
For They That Sow the Wind, Parasol unit for contemporary art
Some Pigeons Are More Equal Than Others, Lars Müler Publishers
Das Numen, Distanz
An Invitation to Disappear, ROMA Publications
As We Used to Float, K. Verlag
Second Suns, Hatje Cantz
Towards No Earthly Pole, Mousse Publishing

1987 births
Swiss contemporary artists
Living people
People from Morges